February & Heavenly is Tomoko Kawase's sixth solo studio album, her first under the Warner Music Japan record label. Released February 29, 2012, the album is a double album featuring Kawase as both the 6 and heavenly6 personas. The album is Tommy february6's third studio album, and heavenly6's fourth. february & heavenly debuted at #7 on the Oricon albums chart.

Release and promotion
In May 2010, the song "I'm Your Devil" was used in a CM for MODE, in which there are two versions of the CM was released. The song was released as a digital download on October 7, 2010. Tommy then announced plans to release a full physical single of "I'm Your Devil", along with a new Tommy february6 album, to be titled "I'LL BE BACK". Shortly after, the 2011 Tōhoku earthquake and tsunami took place and Tommy announced she was postponing the album until further notice to take time to grieve.

After months of inactivity, Tommy heavenly6 performed her song "Pray" at the 2011 Cherry Blossom Festival in Japan, and released exclusive "Pray" themed merchandise through Lightvan Company, including a kimono style robe and plush toy. In August 2011, Tommy stated via Twitter she is resuming work on demos for both Tommy heavenly6 and Tommy february6.

Finally, in September 2011 Tommy announced her next single for Tommy heavenly6 as "Monochrome Rainbow", with an October 26, 2011, release date. "Monochrome Rainbow" was also used as the second season ending song for the anime, Bakuman. Previews for the "Monochrome Rainbow" and "I'm Your Devil" music videos premiered October 28, 2011. The six-minute version of "I'm Your Devil" debuted on November 8, 2011. On November 11, 2011, Tommy announced during an interview with J-Wave Circus Circus she is in the process of recording a double album featuring both Tommy heavenly6 and Tommy february6, set for release in 2012. Warner released a press release on December 1, 2011, stating the album's release date as February 29, 2012. The album's title was later revealed to be "february & heavenly". Kawase appeared on the cover of Volume 89 of Marquee magazine, promoting the album. The video for HOT CHOCOLAT, and full-length videos for "Monochrome Rainbow" and "I'm Your Devil" premiered on Space Shower TV February 9th, 2012. The same day, a promotional download of Hot Chocolat was made available which also featured a preview for the album.

The album was released February 29, 2012, and debuted at #7 on the Oricon albums chart.

Track listing
The official track listing was posted to the Warner Music Japan site on January 30, 2012.

References

External links 
 Tommy heavenly6 Official Site
 Tommy february6 Official Site

Tomoko Kawase albums
2012 albums
Warner Music Japan albums